The 5th constituency of the Côte-d'Or is a French legislative constituency in the Côte-d'Or département. Like the other 576 French constituencies, it elects one MP using the two-round system.

Description

Côte-d'Or's 5th constituency covers the southern section of the department with Beaune as its largest settlement.

Between 1988 and 2017, control of the seat  swung between the Socialist Party and Gaullists, until centrist LREM won the seat in 2017.

Historic Representation

Election results

2022 

 
 
|-
| colspan="8" bgcolor="#E9E9E9"|
|-

2017

2012

References

5